John Smith Miller House is a historic home located near Boone, Watauga County, North Carolina.  It was built in 1906, and is a two-story, side gable, "L"-plan, chestnut frame I-house.  It has a one-story rear ell with side porch.  The front facade features a central gabled two-tier porch.

It was listed on the National Register of Historic Places in 2009.

References

Houses on the National Register of Historic Places in North Carolina
Houses completed in 1906
Houses in Watauga County, North Carolina
National Register of Historic Places in Watauga County, North Carolina
1906 establishments in North Carolina